Eric Martin Strobel (born June 5, 1958) is an American former ice hockey forward who was a member of the "Miracle on Ice" 1980 gold medal-winning U.S. Olympic hockey team.

Amateur career
Strobel attended Rochester Mayo High School where he earned all-conference honors in 1973-74, 1974–75 and 1975–76 before moving on to the University of Minnesota. He was a member of the 1979 University of Minnesota Golden Gophers NCAA championship team.

International
Strobel first played for Team USA at the 1979 Ice Hockey World Championships in Moscow. His coach from Minnesota, Herb Brooks, was the coach for the U.S. for the 1980 Winter Olympics.

Professional career
Drafted 133rd overall in the 1978 NHL Entry Draft by the Buffalo Sabres, Strobel never played with the parent club.  He managed only half a season as a professional playing for their top minor league team, the Rochester Americans of the American Hockey League (AHL), before he broke his ankle during an AHL playoff game in the spring of 1980, and retired from hockey.

Post playing career
Strobel returned to Minnesota after his retirement and became a telephone sales executive in Apple Valley, Minnesota.

He previously coached the Peewee A team for the Eastview Athletic Association in Apple Valley.

Personal
Strobel met his future wife Kim when he returned to university after his playing career ended, and they have two daughters, Leslie and Krista. Strobel's father, Art Strobel played for the New York Rangers.

Eric Strobel suffered a minor stroke on October 31, 2006 and recovered in the hospital. He leads a normal life after undergoing physical therapy.

In popular culture
Strobel was not featured in Miracle on Ice, a 1981 TV movie, but appears in archival footage of the gold medal ceremony.

Robbie MacGregor portrayed Strobel in the 2004 film Miracle.

Awards and honors

Career statistics

Regular season and playoffs

International

References

External links

Strobel's Hockeydraftcentral.com bio

1958 births
1980 US Olympic ice hockey team
American men's ice hockey right wingers
Buffalo Sabres draft picks
Ice hockey players from Minnesota
Ice hockey players at the 1980 Winter Olympics
Living people
Medalists at the 1980 Winter Olympics
Minnesota Golden Gophers men's ice hockey players
Olympic gold medalists for the United States in ice hockey
People from Apple Valley, Minnesota
Rochester Americans players
Sportspeople from Rochester, Minnesota
NCAA men's ice hockey national champions